Patrick W. Brunner (September 8, 1903 – April 2, 1971) was an American farmer, stationary engineer, and politician.

Born in the town of Lemonweir, Juneau County, Wisconsin, Brunner went to school in Mauston, Wisconsin. He then farmed and later was a stationary engineer. He was also in general merchandising. Brunner lived in Lyndon Station, Wisconsin. From 1941 to 1947, Brunner served in the Wisconsin State Assembly as a Republican. In 1948, Brunner moved to Madison, Wisconsin where he worked as a stationary engineer for the United States Forest Products Laboratory. In 1968, Brunner moved to Wausau, Wisconsin. Brunner died in Wausau, Wisconsin of a heart attack.

Notes

1903 births
1971 deaths
People from Juneau County, Wisconsin
Businesspeople from Wisconsin
Farmers from Wisconsin
Republican Party members of the Wisconsin State Assembly
20th-century American businesspeople
20th-century American politicians